Ehsan Abdelmalek (born 27 November 1986) is an Egyptian female handball player who plays for Nice Handball and the Egypt national team.

Achievements  
Coupe de la Ligue:
Finalist: 2016

References

Egyptian female handball players
1986 births
Living people
Expatriate handball players
Egyptian expatriates in France
21st-century Egyptian people